The Canadian federal budget for fiscal year 1970-1971 was presented by Minister of Finance Edgar Benson in the House of Commons of Canada on 12 March 1970.

External links 

 Budget Speech

References

Canadian budgets
1970 in Canadian law
1970 government budgets
1970 in Canadian politics